Nikolay Fyodorovich Kiselyov (25 October 1939 – 2005) was a Soviet Nordic combined athlete, Master of Sports of the USSR, International Class. He trained at the Armed Forces sports society in Leningrad. His best finish was a silver medal at the 1964 Winter Olympics in Innsbruck in the individual event.

External links
 
 Biography of Nikolay Kiselyov 
 

1939 births
2005 deaths
Soviet male Nordic combined skiers
Nordic combined skiers at the 1964 Winter Olympics
Olympic Nordic combined skiers of the Soviet Union
Medalists at the 1964 Winter Olympics
Olympic medalists in Nordic combined
Olympic silver medalists for the Soviet Union
Armed Forces sports society athletes